TalTech Volleyball is the volleyball club of Tallinn University of Technology based in Tallinn, Estonia. The team competes in the Baltic Volleyball League and the Estonian Volleyball League.

The team plays its home games at TalTech Sports Hall.

History
The team was founded as TTÜ VK (Tallinna Tehnikaülikooli Võrkpalliklubi), but changed to TalTech in 2018.

Team

2021/2022

Honours
Baltic Volleyball League
 Winners (1): 2012–13

References

External links
 Official website 

Estonian volleyball clubs
Sport in Tallinn
Tallinn University of Technology